Girl on the Run is a 1958 private detective film directed by Richard L. Bare and starring Efrem Zimbalist Jr., Erin O'Brien, Shepperd Strudwick, Edd Byrnes and Barton MacLane.

The film is based on characters and situations created by writer Roy Huggins in a series of 1940s novels and novellas. It aired on ABC as the pilot for 77 Sunset Strip after an brief theatrical release in the Caribbean.

Plot
In a large Northeastern American city, nightclub singer Karen Allen witnesses the murder of a witness in a major trial. Though Karen had a good view of the witness's murderer, she is unable to identify his photograph in police files. After a sniper unsuccessfully makes an attempt on her life, Karen flees to the West Coast of the United States.

Singing under a new identity and hair style, Karen meets Stuart Bailey, a former university professor of languages and O.S.S. agent who she discovers is a private detective. Stu realises he's been hired by someone to locate her and make her the target of a young hired assassin.

Cast
Efrem Zimbalist Jr. as Stuart Bailey
Erin O'Brien as Kathy Allen/Karen Shay
Shepperd Strudwick as James McCullough/Ralph Graham
Edward Byrnes as Kenneth Smiley
Barton MacLane as Francis J. Brannigan
Ray Teal as Harper
Vince Barnett as Janitor
Harry Lauter as Drunk
O'Brien's singing voice was not dubbed; she appeared as a featured solo singer on six episodes of The Steve Allen Show during this period.

Production
Writer Roy Huggins created the story's characters in a series of 1940s novels and novellas, but Marion Hargrove wrote the screenplay for Girl on the Run. Warner Bros. released the film with Hargrove's title, and when it later aired on television, it was not the debut of a new series but the television premiere of a theatrical film. This allowed Warner Bros. to claim that the resulting 77 Sunset Strip television series was based on Girl on the Run, which it wholly owned, rather than on Huggins' literary work.

In an interview with the Archive of American Television, director Bare recalled that the film was a result of an idea that Warner Bros. Television could create a B movie feature film. The film was shot in ten days, however it was decided to show the film to the American Broadcasting Company who wanted to turn the film into a weekly series, but with two provisos. The film would not be shown theatrically in the USA but would appear as the first episode of the series. Secondly, ABC wanted Edd Byrnes as a series regular. In the film Byrnes played vicious killer Kenneth Smiley, who compulsively combs his hair. When the youth audience reacted favorably to his performance, Byrnes was offered the role of a new recurring character in the television series.

In 77 Sunset Strip, Byrnes became Kookie, a comical carhop who also compulsively combs his hair. Byrne's appearance in Girl on the Run was addressed directly in the series. At the beginning of the episode that followed Girl on the Run, Zimbalist broke the fourth wall with the announcement:We previewed this show, and because Edd Byrnes was such a hit, we decided that Kookie and his comb had to be in our series. So this week, we'll just forget that in the pilot he went off to prison to be executed.

References

Citations

Sources

External links
Roy Huggins' Archive of American Television Interview
Girl on the Run at the Internet Movie Database
Stuart Bailey at Thrilling Detective

1958 television films
1958 films
1958 drama films
American black-and-white films
American detective films
Films directed by Richard L. Bare
Films set in Los Angeles
Television films as pilots
Warner Bros. films
American drama television films
1950s English-language films
1950s American films